Sir Francis Drake (1540–1596) was an Elizabethan privateer and naval hero.

Francis Drake may also refer to:
Francis Drake (died 1634) (1573–1634), MP for Amersham and Sandwich; nephew of the privateer Francis Drake and Sir Richard Grenville
Sir Francis Drake, 1st Baronet (1588–1637), nephew of the naval hero
Sir Francis Drake, 2nd Baronet (1617–1662), son of 1st Baronet
Sir Francis Drake, 3rd Baronet (1642–1718), nephew of 2nd Baronet
Sir Francis Drake, 4th Baronet (1694–1740), son of 3rd Baronet; MP for Tavistock
Sir Francis Henry Drake, 5th Baronet (1723–1794), Master of the Household and MP for Bere Alston
Francis Drake (antiquary) (1696–1771), English antiquary and surgeon
Francis William Drake (1724–1787), third son of Francis Henry; British admiral and Governor of Newfoundland 
Sir Francis Samuel Drake, 1st Baronet (1729–1789), fourth son of Francis Henry; British admiral
Francis Drake (diplomat) (1764–1821), British diplomat
Francis M. Drake (1830–1903), American politician
Francis Drake (MP for Surrey), English politician
Francis John Drake (1860–1929), medical superintendent at Launceston Hospital
Francis Samuel Drake (historian) (1828–1885), American historian

Other uses 
Sir Francis Drake (TV series), British television series 1961–1962
Sir Francis Drake,  one of the GWR 3031 Class locomotives that were built for and run on the Great Western Railway between 1891 and 1915
Sir Francis Drake Channel,  a strait in the British Virgin Islands
, a Royal Navy frigate involved in the 1811 Invasion of Java

See also
Frank Drake (1930–2022), American astronomer
Frank Drake (comics), fictional character appearing in Marvel Comics
Frances Drake (1912–2000), American actress
Frances Ann Denny Drake, American actress